Jeevana Jyothi is a 1988 Indian Telugu-language drama film, produced by D. Pratap Raju and directed by Relangi Narasimha Rao. It stars Sarath Babu, Jayasudha, Rajendra Prasad and Khushbu, with music composed by Raj–Koti. The film was a remake of Tamil film Thaali Dhaanam.

Plot 
The film begins on an ideal couple Sridhar (Sarath Babu) & Kalyani (Jayasudha) who are perturbed as they are childless. Parallelly as a glimpse, Akbar (Rajendra Prasad) their servant whom Kalyani endears as her son, and he too is like-minded. Akbar loves and marries his love interest Noorjahan (Kushboo). Meanwhile, Kalyani gets pregnant, but to her misfortune, she goes into a miscarriage and doctors declare that she cannot conceive again. So, she forcibly performs remarriage to Sridhar with his secretary Nirmala (Mano Chitra). All is well, until Nirmala's mother Durgamma (Jaya Vijaya) a shrew, walks in. Later, Nirmala gives birth to a baby girl, Kalyani dots upon and fosters the baby. Just after, Durgamma creates turbulence which makes Kalyani leave the house along with Akbar & Noorjahan. Years roll by, when, Sridhar's daughter's alliance is fixed when Kalyani moves, nevertheless, she is terminally ill. Meanwhile, Sridhar is bankrupted and the wedding is disrupted due to dowry. Thereupon, Kalyani arrives and performs the wedding by sacrificing her diamond wedding chain Mangalasutram gifted by Sridhar, a long ago. Finally, Kalyani departs in her husband's lap and Akbar carries out her last rites.

Cast 
Sarath Babu as Sridhar
Jayasudha as Kalyani
Rajendra Prasad as Akbar
Khushbu as Noorjahan
Rallapalli  as Abdulla Ali Khan
Narra Venkateswara Rao
Potti Prasad
KK Sarma
Juttu Narasimham as Ali
Mano Chitra as Nirmala
Jhansi
Jaya Vijaya as Durgamma
Dubbing Janaki
Nirmalamma

Soundtrack 

Music composed by Raj–Koti. Music released on Cauvery Audio Company.

Awards 
Nandi Awards - 1988
 Best Male Comedian - Rallapalli
 Best Male Playback Singer - K. J. Yesudas for "Neeve Namma Jyothi"

References

External links 

Indian drama films
Films directed by Relangi Narasimha Rao
Films scored by Raj–Koti
1980s Telugu-language films
1988 drama films
1988 films
Telugu remakes of Tamil films